Matija Protić (born 5 March 1994) is a Serbian football midfielder who plays for Sloga Požega.

Career statistics

Honours
Mladost
Serbian First League: 2013–14

References

External links
 
 Matija Protić stats at utakmica.rs
 Matija Protić stats at footballdatabase.eu

1994 births
Living people
Sportspeople from Čačak
Association football midfielders
Serbian footballers
FK Mladost Lučani players
FK Polet Ljubić players
Serbian SuperLiga players